Saido Indjai (born 19 July 1981), commonly known as Banjai, is a Guinea-Bissauan professional footballer who plays as a central defender.

Club career
Born in Bissau, Banjai spent his entire career in Portugal. He amassed Segunda Liga totals of 250 matches and 11 goals during nine seasons, representing in the competition C.F. União de Lamas, S.C. Covilhã, U.D. Oliveirense and Leixões SC.

References

External links

1981 births
Living people
Sportspeople from Bissau
Bissau-Guinean footballers
Association football defenders
Liga Portugal 2 players
Segunda Divisão players
Lusitânia F.C. players
Ermesinde S.C. players
FC Porto B players
C.F. União de Lamas players
Louletano D.C. players
S.C. Covilhã players
U.D. Oliveirense players
Leixões S.C. players
Guinea-Bissau international footballers
Bissau-Guinean expatriate footballers
Expatriate footballers in Portugal
Bissau-Guinean expatriate sportspeople in Portugal